The Men's 50 Breaststroke event at the 11th FINA World Aquatics Championships swam 26 and 27 July 2005 in Montreal, Canada. Preliminary and Semifinal heats were on 26 July; the final was held on 27 July.

Prior to the competition, the existing World (WR) and Championships (CR) records were:
WR: 27.18 swum by Oleg Lisogor (Ukraine) on 2 August 2002 in Berlin, Germany;
CR: 27.46 swum by James Gibson (Great Britain) on 22 July 2003 in Barcelona, Spain.

Results

Final

Semifinals

Preliminaries

References
Worlds 2005 results: Men’s 50 m breaststroke Heats, from OmegaTiming.com (official timer of the 2005 Worlds); Retrieved 2011-01-21.
Worlds 2005 results: Men’s 50 m breaststroke Semifinals, from OmegaTiming.com (official timer of the 2005 Worlds); Retrieved 2011-01-21.
Worlds 2005 results: Men’s 50 m breaststroke Finals, from OmegaTiming.com (official timer of the 2005 Worlds); Retrieved 2011-01-21.

Swimming at the 2005 World Aquatics Championships